The Impossible Mrs. Bellew is a 1922 American silent drama film directed by Sam Wood and starring Gloria Swanson. The film is based on the 1916 novel of the same name by David Lisle.

Plot
As described in a film magazine review, Lance Bellew likes his mistress better than his wife Betty. This is resented by Jerry Woodruff, a friend of the family. Lance becomes suspicious of the relations between Jerry and his wife, and in a fight he shoots Jerry. A clever lawyer, by working on her love for her little son, gets Betty to testify for her husband. Lance is acquitted on the basis that the killing was justified. To humiliate her, Lance divorces his wife and obtains custody of the child. Mrs. Bellew finds how hard it is to get along with a ruined reputation. With a new friend who is a constant help to her, she overcomes her difficulties and her child is restored to her.

Cast

Preservation
With no prints of The Impossible Mrs. Bellew located in any film archives, it is a lost film.

See also
Gertrude Astor filmography

References

External links

Advertising cards at www.silentfilmstillarchive.com

1922 films
1922 drama films
1922 lost films
Silent American drama films
American silent feature films
American black-and-white films
Famous Players-Lasky films
Films directed by Sam Wood
Films based on British novels
Paramount Pictures films
Lost American films
Lost drama films
1920s American films